Jacob Omondi (born 23 October 1978) is a Kenyan former footballer who played as a striker.

Career
Omondi played club football for Sher Agencies / Karuturi and Finlays Horticulture.

He earned 10 caps for the Kenyan national team, scoring once.

References

1978 births
Living people
Kenyan footballers
Kenya international footballers
Vegpro F.C. players
Finlays Horticulture A.F.C. players
Association football forwards